Elimia macglameriana was a species of freshwater snails with an operculum, aquatic gastropod mollusks in the family Pleuroceridae. This species was endemic to the United States. It is now extinct.

References 

macglameriana
Extinct gastropods
Taxa named by Edwin Stephen Goodrich
Gastropods described in 1936
Taxonomy articles created by Polbot